The 1933 Singapore Open, also known as the 1933 Singapore Badminton Championships, took place from 15 July – 16 December 1933 at the S.V.C Drill Hall in City Hall and Villa Dolce in Tanjong Katong, Singapore. The ties were played over a few months with the first round ties being played on the 15th of July and the last few ties (the women's doubles and the mixed doubles finals) were played on the 16th of December at Villa Dolce due to the S.V.C Drill Hall being unavailable.

Final results

References 

Singapore Open (badminton)
1933 in badminton